What Price Crime or What Price Crime? is a 1935 American crime film directed by Albert Herman and starring Charles Starrett, Noel Madison and Virginia Cherrill.

Cast
 Charles Starrett as Allen Grey  
 Noel Madison as Douglas Worthington  
 Virginia Cherrill as Sandra Worthington 
 Charles Delaney as Armstrong  
 Jack Mulhall as Hopkins  
 Nina Guilbert as Mrs. Worthington  
 Henry Roquemore as Peter Crenshaw  
 Gordon Griffith as Red - a Gangster  
 John Elliott as Chief Radcliff  
 Arthur Loft as Donahue  
 Earl Tree as Graham  
 John Cowell as Davis 
 Edwin Argus as Lefty  
 Al Baffert as Battling Brennan

References

Bibliography
 Pitts, Michael R. Poverty Row Studios, 1929–1940: An Illustrated History of 55 Independent Film Companies, with a Filmography for Each. McFarland & Company, 2005.

External links
 

1935 films
1935 crime films
American crime films
Films directed by Albert Herman
Majestic Pictures films
American black-and-white films
1930s English-language films
1930s American films